Cheryl Hole (born 18 October 1993) is the stage name of Luke Underwood-Bleach, an English drag queen from Chelmsford in Essex who is known for being one of the first contestants on RuPaul's Drag Race UK (2019) and later the first season of RuPaul's Drag Race: UK vs the World (2022). Cheryl's act is based on former Girls Aloud singer Cheryl Cole.

Career
On 3 April 2019 Cheryl Hole and her fiancé Haydn took part in the Comedy Central show Your Face Or Mine? hosted by Jimmy Carr and Katherine Ryan.

On 21 August 2019, Hole was announced as one of the 10 queens to be competing in the first series of RuPaul's Drag Race UK. In episode 6, she lip synched to Cheryl's "Call My Name" in front of guest judge Cheryl, sending Blu Hydrangea home. She was eliminated in episode 7 (the penultimate episode) after losing a lip sync to Baga Chipz to Amy Winehouse's Tears Dry on Their Own. Hole reached fourth place in the contest.

On 28 November 2019, Hole, alongside the cast of series one of RuPaul's Drag Race UK, embarked on a 12-gig UK tour, hosted by Drag Race alum Alyssa Edwards.

December 2019 Cheryl Hole was unveiled as Virgin Media's Christmas 'fairy gift mother' for their Christmas campaign giving gift and surprises to Virgin Media customers.

In July 2020 Cheryl started her new podcast called Girl Group Gossip produced by World of Wonder, where Cheryl is joined by a co-host and a special guest related to the topic of that episode.

November 2020 Cheryl Hole joined Drag Race UK series 1 winner The Vivienne on the UK version of the Netflix YouTube series I Like to Watch for three consecutive episodes.

On the 24th September 2021 Cheryl Hole and her partner Haydn tied the knot, their last names were then double barrelled to Underwood-Bleach.

In January 2022, she was announced as one of the nine contestants on RuPaul's Drag Race: UK vs the World. After falling into the bottom for her performance in the ball challenge she was eliminated by Janey Jacké who won the lipsync for the world against Jimbo. She was the second queen eliminated in the competition, ultimately placing eighth overall, and released her debut single "Need the Power" on 11 February 2022 after her elimination. The single was co-written by Cheryl alongside the creative team behind fellow Drag Race star Priyanka's Taste Test EP. She released the song's music video the same day, featuring numerous guests including fellow RuPaul's Drag Race UK stars Vanity Milan, River Medway and Elektra Fence. In March 2022 Cheryl was announced to have been voted by her RuPaul's Drag Race: UK vs the World castmates as the season's Miss Congeniality, sharing the title with Janey Jacké and Jujubee, with Pangina Heals and Blu Hydrangea casting their vote for Cheryl.

In 2022 she made her West End debut in the play Death Drop

Discography

Singles

As lead artist

As featured artist

Guest appearances

Filmography

Television

Web

Podcasts

Music videos

References

External links 

 

1993 births
Living people
20th-century LGBT people
21st-century LGBT people
English drag queens
English expatriates in the United States
Gay entertainers
People from Essex
Cheryl Hole